"In 20-0-3" is a song by the British musician Joe Jackson. It was self-distributed via his personal website and not available on any album.

The lyrics of "In 20-0-3" criticizes the decision of New York mayor Michael Bloomberg in the year 2003 to ban smoking in every bar and club in the city, stating that 'secondhand smoke' was killing 1,000 New Yorkers per year.

"In 20-0-3" was released in partnership with FOREST (Freedom Organisation for the Right to Enjoy Smoking Tobacco) and was made available to order on Jackson's website. The proceeds of the song went towards fighting smoking bans. Jackson told The Independent in 2004, "I'm one of those songwriters who writes about anything and everything. In this case, I wrote a song about something that made me angry."

Jackson actively campaigned against smoking bans in both the United States and the United Kingdom. In 2005 he published the pamphlet The Smoking Issue and in 2007 the essay Smoke, Lies and the Nanny State.

Personnel 
 Musicians
 Joe Jackson – piano, organ, vocals
 Steve Hampton – guitar, bass
 Dave Houghton – drums

 Production
 Joe Jackson – arrangements, production
 Julie Gardner – recording and mixing engineer
 Bob Bruce – recording engineer

References

External links 
 Non-album tracks information at The Joe Jackson Archive

Joe Jackson (musician) songs
Songs written by Joe Jackson (musician)
2004 songs